The Province of Nassau was a province of Prussia from 1944 to 1945.

Although all German states (including Prussia) had been de facto dissolved since 1933, the Nazi government formally partitioned the Prussian province of Hesse-Nassau into two provinces with a decree issued on 1 April 1944 and effective on 1 July 1944. The two new provinces were the province of Kurhessen and the province of Nassau.

The name comes from the former Duchy of Nassau (1806–1866), which Prussia annexed following the Austro-Prussian War to form part of the province of Hesse-Nassau. The territory of the province was larger than that of the former duchy, encompassing those areas of the NSDAP  not part of the People's State of Hesse.

Following the end of World War II, most of the province of Nassau fell under American administration. The province of Nassau was dissolved by the occupying US forces on 19 September 1945, forming part of the administrative zone of Greater Hesse along with Kurhessen and the American parts of the People's State of Hesse. Just over a year later, Greater Hesse became the modern German state of Hesse.

References
Erlaß des Führers über die Bildung der Provinzen Kurhessen und Nassau

Provinces of Prussia
Nassau (state)
Former states and territories of Rhineland-Palatinate
1944 establishments in Germany
1945 disestablishments in Germany
States and territories established in 1944
States and territories disestablished in 1945